Quad City-style pizza is a variety of pizza originating in the Quad Cities region of the states of Illinois and Iowa in the United States.

Characteristics
Characteristics of Quad City-style pizza include malt in the crust, tomato sauce made with red chili flakes and/or cayenne pepper, toppings placed under the cheese, and being cut into strips instead of triangular slices.

History  

The first person to bring pizza to the Quad Cities was Tony Maniscalco Sr. in 1952. Born of two immigrant parents from Sicily, Maniscalco came to the Quad Cities from Calumet City, Illinois, where he was a butcher by trade. He developed "Quad Cities Style Pizza" using a base recipe from the Bacino family.

Preparation
Quad City-style pizza dough contains a characteristic spice jam which is heavy on malt, which lends it a toasted, nutty flavor. The pizzas are hand-tossed to be stretched into an even quarter-inch thin crust with a slight lip ringing the edge. The sauce contains both red chili flakes and ground cayenne, and the smooth, thin tomato spread is more spicy than sweet. The sausage is typically a thick blanket of lean, fennel-flecked Italian sausage sometimes ground twice and spread from edge to edge. The pizzas are cooked using a special gas oven with an average cooking time of about 12 minutes. The pizza is cut into strips, as opposed to being cut in slices. An average 16-inch pizza has about 14 strips, and a 10-inch pizza has about 10 strips.

By region
The dish originates in the Quad Cities region of the United States.  

The dish has been prepared in other areas of the United States, including Mahtomedi, Minnesota, Acworth, Georgia, Harrisburg, North Carolina, Mesa, Arizona West Des Moines, and Chicago.

The Outsiders Pizza Company now sells a frozen version of the Quad City-style pizza nationwide through major retail store chains.

See also
 List of regional dishes of the United States
 St. Louis cuisine

References

Further reading
 

Pizza in the United States
Cuisine of the Midwestern United States
Quad Cities
Pizza styles